The 2007 County Championship season, known as the LV County Championship for sponsorship reasons, was contested through two divisions: Division One and Division Two. Each team plays all the others in their division both home and away. The top two teams from Division Two were promoted to the first division for 2008, while the bottom two sides from Division 1 were relegated.

Teams in the County Championship 2007:

Standings
Fourteen points were awarded for each win, four points were awarded for a draw or abandonment. Defeats scored no points. Teams were awarded bonus points during the first 130 overs of their first innings; one bowling point for every three wickets taken (up to three points available), and one batting point gained when teams reached 200, 250, 300, 350 and 400 runs (up to five points available).

Division One

Division Two

Leading averages

References

County Championship, 2007
County Championship seasons